Rupa Rural Municipality (Rupa Gaupalika) is a Gaunpalika in Kaski District in Gandaki Province of Nepal. On 12 March 2017, the government of Nepal implemented a new local administrative structure, in which VDCs have been replaced with municipal and Village Councils. Rupa is one of these 753 local units.

Demographics
At the time of the 2011 Nepal census, Rupa Rural Municipality had a population of 14,526. Of these, 76.7% spoke Nepali, 13.4% Gurung, 4.0% Newar, 3.2% Urdu, 2.0% Magar, 0.2% Bhojpuri, 0.1% Tamang and 0.4% other languages as their first language.

In terms of ethnicity/caste, 25.8% were Hill Brahmin, 14.6% Gurung, 11.6% Chhetri, 9.4% Kami, 6.9% Newar, 6.1% Magar, 5.4% Damai/Dholi, 4.4% Thakuri, 4.3% Kumal, 3.9% Sarki, 3.3% Musalman, 2.1% Gharti/Bhujel, 0.5% Sanyasi/Dasnami, 0.3% Khawas, 0.2% Bote, 0.2% other Dalit, 0.2% Tamang, 0.1% Badi, 0.1% Dura, 0.1% Rai and 0.3% others.

In terms of religion, 86.4% were Hindu, 9.8% Buddhist, 3.3% Muslim, 0.3% Christian and 0.1% others.

In terms of literacy, 75.1% could both read and write, 2.0% could only read and 22.8% could neither read nor write.

References 

Populated places in Kaski District
Rural municipalities of Nepal established in 2017
Rural municipalities in Kaski District